Algerian coup may refer to:

 The 1965 Algerian coup d'état, replacing President Ahmed Ben Bella with Houari Boumédiène
 The Algerian Civil War, which began after the army staged a coup in 1991 to prevent the political party Islamic Salvation Front from taking power